Paracho de Verduzco (often called Paracho) is a small city located in Michoacán, Mexico. It has a population of 37,464.

Paracho is well known throughout both Mexico and elsewhere in the world as a hub of lutherie. This is because the town's craftsmen are reputed to make the best sounding guitars and vihuelas in all of Mexico. The town is full of music shops that sell handmade stringed instruments. Some instruments that can be found in Paracho are: ten-string mandolins, armadillo-backed guitars (concheras) and mandolins, and acoustic bass guitars, as well as regular classical guitars and mandolins, bajo sextos, vihuelas, guitarrones and many others. Many of the stores and workshops allow visitors to watch the guitar-making process directly.

A national festival "Feria de La Guitarra" is held in Paracho once a year, usually the second week of August. Lasting nine days having its culture, gastronomic and traditions display. From its traditional "Pan" to its famous guitars, Paracho is rich in culture and traditions.

See also 
 List of guitar manufacturers

References

External links
 Award winning 2007 Documentary about the luthiers of Paracho

Populated places in Michoacán